Strong Enough to Bend is the seventeenth studio album by American country music artist Tanya Tucker, released in 1988. The album contains three singles that made the Billboard Top Ten Country singles charts: "Strong Enough to Bend" at number one, "Highway Robbery" at number two, and "Call on Me" at number four. The single "Daddy and Home" rose to number 27, while the album itself peaked at number nine on the country albums chart.

Track listing

Production
Produced By Jerry Crutchfield
Engineered By Scott Hendricks

Personnel
Tanya Tucker - lead vocals
James Stroud - drums, percussion
Bob Wray - bass guitar
Mitch Humphries, Dave Innis - keyboards, synthesizer
Steve Gibson, Kenny Mims, Don Potter - guitar
Paul Franklin - steel guitar
Mark O'Connor - fiddle
Paul Franklin, Steve Gibson - dobro
Steve Gibson - mandolin
Jim Horn - saxophone
Michael Black, Jessica Boucher, Beth Nielsen Chapman, Carol Chase, Greg Gordon, Katerina Kitridge, Diane Vanette, Hurshel Wiginton, Dennis Wilson, Curtis Young - background vocals

Chart performance

References

The Billboard Book of Top 40 Country Hits by Joel Whitburn [2006] 
Liner Notes; Tanya Tucker "Strong Enough To Bend" CD; 1988 Liberty/Capitol Records.

1988 albums
Tanya Tucker albums
Capitol Records albums
Albums produced by Jerry Crutchfield